Borislav Pelević (22 November 1956 – 25 October 2018) was a Serbian politician. He was president of the nationalist Party of Serbian Unity (SSJ), a party with marginal importance in Serbian politics, until it merged with the Serbian Radical Party in December 2007.

Military and political career
Pelević was a commander of the Arkan's Tigers paramilitary during the War in Croatia, serving at the Erdut training camp. He was also a presidential candidate in September and December 2002 and in 2004.

He was elected to the National Assembly of Serbia on the Serbian Radical Party list twice, in 2007 and 2008. After the party's deputy leader, Tomislav Nikolić (who was also acting as parliamentary leader due to the absence of party leader Vojislav Šešelj), resigned from the SRS and formed the new Napred Srbijo! ("Forward, Serbia!") parliamentary group, Pelević left the SRS and joined Nikolić's group.

Pelević has also served as president of the kickboxing federation of Serbia and Montenegro.

Death
He died on 25 October 2018, after a long illness.

References

1956 births
2018 deaths
Politicians from Peja
Kosovo Serbs
Members of the National Assembly (Serbia)
Serbian Progressive Party politicians
Serbian Radical Party politicians
Candidates for President of Serbia
Serbian soldiers
Military personnel of the Croatian War of Independence
Serbian nationalists
Party of Serbian Unity politicians
Council of Serbian Unity politicians
Military personnel from Peja